An election to Sligo County Council took place on 23 May 2014 as part of that year's Irish local elections. 18 councilors were elected from two electoral divisions by PR-STV voting for a five-year term of office.

Ahead of the 2014 election Sligo was redrawn into two electoral areas, a reduction in three from five, and the number of councilors was reduced to 18, from a previous total of 25. The Sligo Borough Council was also abolished. Fianna Fáil had a very good election, increasing their seat numbers by 1 to 8 seats. Sinn Féin gained 1 seat, as did People Before Profit, and Independents increased their numbers by 1 seat to 4. In contrast, Fine Gael lost 9 seats, being reduced to just 3 Councillors, while the Labour Party suffered a wipe out, losing representation on the council for the first time since 1912.

Results by party

Results by Electoral Area
 Sitting in italics

Ballymote-Tubbercurry

Sligo

Post-election changes

† Co-options

†† Co-options

††† Co-options

†††† Co-options

References

External links
 Official website

2014 Irish local elections
2014